Else Krüger (9 February 1915 – 24 January 2005) was Martin Bormann's secretary (and, allegedly, mistress) from the end of 1942 until 1 May 1945. She was born in Hamburg-Altona.   

She was in the Führerbunker during the Battle of Berlin in World War II. Krüger was with Eva Braun, Gerda Christian, Traudl Junge, and Constanze Manziarly when German dictator Adolf Hitler told them that they must prepare to leave for the Berghof like the others. However, she volunteered to remain with Hitler in the Berlin Führerbunker. She was there when Braun indicated that she would never leave Hitler's side and they embraced.  Hitler gave each of the women a cyanide capsule. Then on the afternoon of 30 April 1945, Hitler and Braun killed themselves.

Thereafter, Krüger left the Führerbunker on 1 May 1945 in a group led by Waffen-SS Brigadeführer Wilhelm Mohnke. On the morning of 2 May, the group was captured by soldiers of the Soviet Red Army while hiding in a cellar at the Schultheiss-Patzenhofer Brewery on Prinzenallee.

After the war Krüger was interrogated by the British. She later married her British interrogator, Leslie James (1915–1995), on 23 December 1947 in Wallasey, Cheshire UK. She lived under the name Else James in Wallasey, and remained married to Leslie until his death. She died in Germany on 24 January 2005 aged 89, despite speculation that she had lived to be much older.

Notes

References

Citations

Bibliography

Secretaries
German people of World War II
1915 births
2005 deaths
Women in World War II